The 2005 Boston College Eagles football team represented Boston College during the 2005 NCAA Division I-A football season. Boston College was in their first year as a member of the Atlantic Coast Conference. The Eagles played their home games at Alumni Stadium in Chestnut Hill, Massachusetts, which has been their home stadium since 1957.

Schedule

Drafted Players (2006 NFL Draft)

References

Boston College
Boston College Eagles football seasons
Famous Idaho Potato Bowl champion seasons
Boston College Eagles football
Boston College Eagles football